Long Island is an island off the Kimberley coast of Western Australia.

References

Buccaneer Archipelago